89 may refer to: 

 89 (number)
 Atomic number 89: actinium

Years
 89 BC
 AD 89
 1989
 2089
 etc.

See also
 
 List of highways numbered